Baby It's So Hard to Be Good is an album by American country singer Ernest Tubb, released in 1972 (see 1972 in music).

Track listing 
 "Baby It's So Hard to Be Good" (Harlan Howard)
 "It's Not Love (But It's Not Bad)" (Hank Cochran, Glenn Martin) 
 "Road Is Closed" (Cochran)
 "Hillbilly Waltz" (G. Russell, Russ Russell)
 "Bubbles in My Beer" (Tommy Duncan, Cindy Walker, Bob Wills)
 "In This Corner" (Marty Robbins)
 "Truck Driving Man" (Terry Fell)
 "Big Blue Diamonds" (Earl "Kit" Carson)
 "I've Got a New Heartache" (Ray Price, Wayne Walker)
 "That Certain One" (Don Reid)
 "I Don't Believe I'll Fall in Love Today" (Howard)

References 

Ernest Tubb albums
1972 albums